François Schuiten (born 26 April 1956) is a Belgian comic book artist. He is best known for drawing the series Les Cités Obscures.

Biography

François Schuiten was born in Brussels, Belgium in 1956. 
His father, Robert Schuiten, and his mother, Marie-Madeleine De Maeyer, were both architects. He has five brothers and sisters, one of whom is also an architect.

During his studies at the Saint-Luc Institute in Brussels (1975–1977), he met Claude Renard, who led the comics department at the school. Together they created several books. Schuiten's brother Luc also worked with him several times as a writer for the series Terres Creuses.

Schuiten published his first comic on 3 May 1973, consisting of 5 black and white pages in the Franco-Belgian comics magazine Pilote; four years later he was published in the more experimental magazine Métal Hurlant.

His love of architecture became apparent in the series Cities of the Fantastic, an evocation of fantastic, partly imaginary cities that he created with his friend Benoît Peeters from 1983 for the Belgian monthly comics magazine (À Suivre). Every story focuses on one city or building, and further explores a world where architects, urbanists, and ultimately "urbatects", are the leading powers and architecture is the driving force behind society. Styles explored in the series include stalinistic and fascist architecture in La Fièvre d'Urbicande, skyscrapers in Brüsel, but also the gothic cathedrals in La Tour. This fascination with architecture and the possible and impossible cities it can generate is further explored in The Gates of the Possible, a weekly series Schuiten created for the newspapers Le Soir and De Morgen in 2005.

Inspired by artists and scientists alike, Schuiten's work can be considered to mix the mysterious worlds of René Magritte, the early scientific fantasies of Jules Verne, the graphical worlds of M. C. Escher and Gustave Doré, and the architectural visions of Victor Horta and Étienne-Louis Boullée. The creative synergy between Schuiten's work and the books of Jules Verne culminated  in 1994 when he was asked to illustrate and design a cover for the publication of Verne's  rediscovered book Paris in the Twentieth Century.

He also collaborated with Maurice Benayoun on the computer graphics series Quarxs, and worked as a production designer for a few movies: Gwendoline by Just Jaeckin, Mr. Nobody and Toto le héros by Jaco Van Dormael, Taxandria by Raoul Servais, The Golden Compass by Chris Weitz and Mars et Avril by Martin Villeneuve. He is currently working with Benoît Sokal and Martin Villeneuve on the script of Aquarica, a film that will use CGI and motion capture technology.

As a scenographer, he designed the metro stations of Porte de Hal in Brussels and Arts et Métiers in Paris, and a mural in Brussels. In 2000, he designed the scenography for A planet of visions, one of the main pavilions of the Hannover World's Fair, which attracted more than five million visitors. In 2004–2005, a large exhibition was held in Leuven, The Gates of Utopia, showing different aspects of his work. He also created the interior of the Belgian pavilion at the Expo 2005 in Aichi, Japan with the painter Alexandre Obolensky. François Schuiten has also designed 15 Belgian stamps.

Schuiten together with Peeters also helped to save and subsequently restore the Maison Autrique, the first house designed by Art Nouveau architect Victor Horta.

François Schuiten married Monique Toussaint in 1980; they have four children.

Awards
 2013: Grand Prize in the Manga category of the Japan Art Festival
 2002: Made a baron by King Albert II of Belgium
 2002: Grand Prix de la ville d'Angoulême, France
 1998: Special Prize of the Jury at the Max & Moritz Prizes, Erlangen, Germany
 1996: Inkpot Award, U.S.
 1987: Grand Prix at the festival of Sierre, Switzerland
 1985: Award for the Best Comic Book at the Angoulême International Comics Festival, France
 1983: Samaris, the first book of Les Cités Obscures, is chosen as one of the 20 best books of the year by French magazine Lire

Bibliography
 Les Cités Obscures: 1983-, 11 albums and some specials, with Benoît Peeters: Casterman
 Dolorès: 1991, 1 album, artist Anne Baltus: Casterman
 Express: 1981, 1 album, with Claude Renard: Magic-Strip
 Les Machinistes: 1 album, 1984, with Claude Renard: Les Humanoïdes Associés
 Métamorphoses: 2 albums, 1980–1982, with Claude Renard: Les Humanoïdes Associés
 Plagiat!: 1 album, 1989, with Benoît Peeters, written by Goffin: Les Humanoïdes Associés
 Souvenirs de l'éternel present: 1 album, 1993, written by Benoît Peeters: Arboris
 La Douce: 1 album, 2012: Casterman (translated into English as The Beauty).
 Les terres creuses: 3 albums, 1980–1990, written by Luc Schuiten: Les Humanoïdes Associés

Works by François Schuiten have been translated in most European languages, including Dutch, German, Danish and English.

Notes

Further reading
 Schuiten, François (2004), "The Book of Schuiten". Nantier Beall Minoustchine Publishing. 
 Darici, Katiuscia (2014), "El cómic y la transmedialidad. El caso de La Doce de François Schuiten en Realidad Aumentada", CIC Cuadernos de Información y Comunicación, 2014, vol. 19, 303–313, ISSN 1135-7991, https://revistas.ucm.es/index.php/CIYC/article/view/43917

External links

 Homesite of Les Cités Obscures, now archived at Alta Plana
 EBBS.net - Former fan site, now archived at Alta Plana 
 Alta Plana - Official fan site
 website of the restored Horta house Maison Autrique
 Biography at the Comiclopedia
 Info on the English editions of his work
 
 A biographical timeline, in Dutch
 The Quarxs
 Comparative analysis on the works of Francois Schuiten/Giambattista Piranesi, in Spanish 

1956 births
Living people
Artists from Brussels
Belgian comics artists
Belgian animators
Grand Prix de la ville d'Angoulême winners